May Queen is a 2012 South Korean melodrama series about three people who experience ambition, revenge, betrayal and love, against the backdrop of the shipbuilding industry in Ulsan during Korea's modernization. It stars Han Ji-hye, Kim Jaewon and Jae Hee.

Synopsis
The heroine Chun Hae-joo (Han Ji-hye) begins life in utter poverty. But despite being burdened with the secret past of her parents, she navigates treacherous waters and overcomes obstacles to achieve her dreams. Her childhood sweetheart Park Chang-hee (Jae Hee), son of the butler to a company chairman, also rises above his humble beginnings to become a successful prosecutor. Bright and playful Kang San (Kim Jaewon), the rival boss's privileged grandson, returns to South Korea after years abroad to find that he still carries a torch for Hae-joo.

The story starts with the murder of a scientist, Yoon Hak Su. When Hak Su received a phone call, his family is scared and worried. Wealthy company chairman, Jang Do Hyun, is revealed to be the murderer of Hak Su. He being the superior of Yoon Hak-su wears a mask of grief and takes part in the memorial service, only to take Hak Su's wife, Lee Geum-hee, as his own wife. Her two year old daughter, Yoon Yu Jin, is robbed from her and given away to Chun Hong Chul, an unemployed and debt-stricken military junior of Park Gi Chul, butler to Jang Do-hyun. Even though Do-hyun orders for Geum Hee's two year old daughter, Yu Jin, to be killed, his butler Park Gi-chul, is unable to do so because of his conscience.

The story moves forward and we see a 13 year old Hae-joo, daughter of the late Yoon Hak-su, living with a family that has a doting foster father Chun Hong Chul, and an ill-mannered and complaining mother, as she believes Hae Joo to be the husband's illegitimate daughter. Park Chang Hee, the butler's 14 year old son, who is ill-treated by the owner's son, Ill Mun, has his own share of grief. Also there is Kang San, a charming, carefree and cheerful heir of the rival group of Jang Do-hyun, Haepoong Shipping Group. He is the heir to his grandfather's business as his parents are dead. They all meet under one roof at the local school in Ulsan, where Kang San, Chang Hee and Ill Mun attend the same class. Due to their similar situations filled with sadness, Chang Hee and Hae Joo start liking each other. However Kang San starts falling for Hae Joo because of her welding ability and cheerful, positive personality.

Due to some tense events, Jang Do-Hyun starts to suspect that his wife's daughter was not killed by the butler 11 years ago and might turn out to be Hae Joo now. So, he orders the butler to solve the problem. Chang Hee's father, the butler, kills Hae Joo's foster father instead when Chun Hong Chul puts himself between his daughter and the butler's stolen vehicle.

Jang Do-Hyun takes over Haepoong Shipping Group through deceit and Kang San's grandfather is jailed unfairly. Kang San moves to America for further studies. Hae Joo's family also moves away from Ulsan to Geo-Jeh.

The story takes a leap in time, 15 years later we see Hae Joo and Park Chang Hee as adults dating. Jang Do-Hyun starts showering respect and praises toward Chang Hee as he is now a Public Prosecutor, a strict one, in hopes that he will protect his company, CheonJi Group. Chang Hee's father, the often abused butler, dreams that one day his son will become the son-in-law of Jang Do-Hyun by marrying Jang Do-Hyun’s daughter, In Hwa. He is seen to be playing matchmaker too.

Jang Do-Hyun’s company bags a contract with an American company which sends their Ship Inspector, Ryan Kang, to oversee the billions of Won project. He turns out to be Kang San who has a big idea for Jang Do-Hyun. He and Hae Joo met at a night club and when she attends an interview for CheonJi Group. She and San work together after he reveals himself. They work together to build a new Azimuth Thruster, so that San can take his Grandfather's company back. But all their efforts are thwarted by Jang Do Hyun. Meanwhile San loses his job, gets stabbed, and loses his grandfather, while Hae-joo struggles with her family poverty and her growing feelings towards Kang San.

Chang Hee under great humiliations and blackmailing from his father marries Jang Do Hyun's daughter, In Hwa, who is in turn in love with Kang San. Chang Hee starts to play with Jang's daughter to get back at her father. He also learns that his father was behind Hae Joo’s foster father's death.

After losing his only support, his grandfather, Kang San starts living on the streets and working at a construction site. From great provocation and support from Hae Joo, he moves into her house and starts anew. He also starts uncovering Hae Joo's father's death facts and finds out about her birth mother. After several attempts at uncovering Jang Do-Hyun’s deceit by taking his wife's and Hae Joo's uncle's help, they succeed in getting evidence against Jang Do-Hyun. Between this, Chang Hee takes the seat of CheonJi Group and starts sinking low. It is revealed that Jang Do-Hyun is the murderer of Yoon Hak Su, and also that he is Hae Joo's biological father. Because of this revelation, Hae Joo rejects Kang San's marriage proposal, which he does after getting the patent rights registered for their invention. Later, however they both kiss and make up.

At the end, we see Chang Hee living with his father at a village while his wife, In Hwa, visits him to say that she loves him. Hae Joo and Kang San leave in their drillship to drill oil in the Pacific whilst he dons her finger with a huge diamond. Jang Do-Hyun, the cause of so much heartbreak, kills himself.

Cast

Main
Han Ji-hye as Chun Hae-joo
Kim Yoo-jung as young Hae-joo
She possesses natural confidence along with a sunny disposition. With an infectious curiosity, she has an enormous positive outlook on life. Her father was a janitor who loved to sail when he had the rare chance to, so she also became interested in boats, which led her to learn how to fix them. But the murder death of her father when she was a sixth grader revealed a secret about her past. She is unable to leave her family because of the sense of duty she feels towards her late father. As she turns into a young adult, she gets involved in offshore oil drilling and finds out that her real biological father committed his life to oil exploration.

Kim Jaewon as Kang San/Ryan Gass Kang
Park Hae-rin as young Kang San
He is a friend of Chang-hee and the grandson of the founder of Haepoong Group. Growing up with a silver spoon in his mouth, he was always cheerful and full of energy. He has a photographic memory that serves him well in the interests he pursues. He had a crush on Hae-joo just like his friend Chang-hee. After spending 15 years abroad, he returns to South Korea and is reunited with Hae-joo, and the old feelings he had for her return once again. Hae-joo's charm and bubbly personality gradually melts Kang San's heart.

Jae Hee as Park Chang-hee
Park Gun-woo as young Chang-hee
He was Hae-joo's first boyfriend. Chang-hee is a perfectionist who keeps his guard up all the time. He is very smart but also a workaholic. Many people mistake him as the son of Cheonji Group's chairman when, in fact, he is the son of the chairman's butler. He chooses the daughter of the Cheonji chairman Iwa Ha over Hae-joo as his wife in order to become rich and end his parents' miserable life. This leads to him being on the opposite side in the rivalry between Cheonji Group and Haepoong Group where Hae-joo and Kang San work alongside each other.

Supporting characters
Son Eun-seo as Jang In-hwa
Jung Ji-so as young In-hwa
Baek Seung-hee as Jo Min-gyeong	

Hae-joo's family
Ahn Nae-sang as Chun Hong-chul 
Geum Bo-ra as Jo Dal-soon 
Moon Ji-yoon as Chun Sang-tae
Kim Dong-hyeon as young Sang-tae
Jung Hye-won as Chun Young-joo
Kang Ji-woo as young Young-joo
Yoon Jung-eun as Chun Jin-joo

Cheonji Group
Lee Deok-hwa as Jang Do-hyun
Yang Mi-kyung as Lee Geum-hee 
Yoon Jong-hwa as Jang Il-moon 
Seo Young-joo as young Il-moon
Kim Kyu-chul as Park Gi-chool

Haepoong Group
Go In-beom as Kang Dae-pyung 
Lee Hoon as Yoon Jung-woo 
Kim Ji-young as Lee Bong-hee
Sunwoo Jae-duk as Yoon Hak-soo

Ratings 
In the table below, the blue numbers represent the lowest ratings and the red numbers represent the highest ratings.

Production
It was reported on October 31, 2012 that male lead Kim Jaewon injured the muscle of his right thigh while shooting a quarreling scene. He was taken to hospital for examination at the completion of filming, received treatment and has since returned to the regular shooting schedule.

Awards
2012 20th Korean Culture and Entertainment Awards
Top Excellence Award, Actress: Han Ji-hye
Hallyu Star Award: Kim Jaewon

2012 1st K-Drama Star Awards
Best Young Actor: Park Gun-tae
Best Young Actress: Kim Yoo-jung

2012 MBC Drama Awards
Top Excellence Award, Actress in a Serial Drama: Han Ji-hye
Top Excellence Award, Actor in a Serial Drama: Kim Jaewon 
Excellence Award, Actor in a Serial Drama: Jae Hee
Best Young Actress: Kim Yoo-jung
Golden Acting Award, Actor: Lee Deok-hwa
Golden Acting Award, Actress: Yang Mi-kyung
Writer of the Year Award: Son Young-mok

References

External links
  
 

2012 South Korean television series debuts
2012 South Korean television series endings
MBC TV television dramas
Korean-language television shows
South Korean melodrama television series
South Korean romance television series
Works about petroleum
Works about ships
Television shows set in Ulsan